The Mountain railways of India are the railway lines that were built in the mountainous regions of India. The term mainly includes the narrow-gauge and metre-gauge railways in these regions but may also include some broad-gauge railways.

Three of the lines, the Darjeeling Himalayan Railway, the Nilgiri Mountain Railway, and the Kalka–Shimla Railway, are collectively designated as a UNESCO World Heritage Site under the name "Mountain Railways of India". Two more, namely the Matheran Hill Railway and the Kangra Valley Railway, are on the tentative list of UNESCO World Heritage Sites. The Nilgiri Mountain Railway is also the only rack and pinion railway in India.

Mountain railways, such as the Jammu–Baramulla line and the Chota Char Dham Railway, are currently under construction, and others are in the planning stage, such as the Srinagar–Leh line and the Bhanupli–Leh line. All the mountain railways constructed in recent times use broad-gauge.

World Heritage Sites
Three railways, the Darjeeling Himalayan Railway(दार्जिलिंग हिमालयन रेलवे), the Nilgiri Mountain Railway (नीलगिरी माउंटैन रेलवे)and the Kalka–Shimla Railway (शिवालिक हिल रेलवे), are collectively designated as a UNESCO World Heritage Site under the name Mountain Railways of India. The Matheran Hill Railway (माथेरन हिल रेलवे)and Kangra Valley Railway (कांगड़ा वैली रेलवे)are on the tentative list of UNESCO World Heritage Sites.

The basis of UNESCO's designation of the Mountain Railways of India as a World Heritage Site is "outstanding examples of bold, ingenious engineering solutions for the problem of establishing an effective rail link through rugged, mountainous terrain." The Darjeeling Himalayan Railway received the honor first in 1999 by UNESCO followed by the Nilgiri Mountain Railway in 2005. The Kalka–Shimla Railway received the designation in 2008. The three routes together have been titled the Mountain Railways of India under UNESCO World Heritage Site criteria ii and iv, within the Asia-Pacific region. The Matheran Hill Railway, a fourth mountain line, has been nominated and is pending approval by the international body.

Darjeeling Himalayan Railway

The latter is a major summer hill station and the centre of a flourishing tea-growing district located in West Bengal. The highest elevation is at Ghoom station, .

The town of Siliguri, the start of the railway route, was connected with Calcutta (now Kolkata) via railway in 1878, while the additional journey to Darjeeling required the use of tongas (horse-driven carts) along a dust track.

On the recommendations of a committee appointed by Sir Ashley Eden, work on the route began in 1879 and was completed by July 1881. The line underwent several improvements such as making its gradients more gradual over the years to increase its manoeuvrability. By 1909–1910, the Darjeeling Himalayan Railway was carrying roughly 174,000 passengers and 47,000 tons of goods annually.

Important features incorporated in the line include four loops (spirals) and four 'Z' reverses (zigzags). The introduction of bogie carriages allowed for the replacement of the basic four wheel carriages formerly used for support and stability. In 1897, a major earthquake damaged the railway, requiring rebuilding of the route, including extensive improvements to the track and stations. Further modernization occurred as part of the Northeast Frontier Railway Zone. Most trains on the route are still powered by steam engines, but a modern diesel engine is used for the Darjeeling Mail train. The railway is notable for its signage located at key vantage points, marking locations with titles such as Agony Point and Sensation Corner. Another feature are spirals on steep hills that provide scenic views of the valleys below.

In 1999, the Darjeeling line was the first to be recognized by UNESCO and placed on the World Heritage List. A condition of being placed upon the list was that steam locomotives would continue to be used along the route.

Nilgiri Mountain Railway

The Nilgiri Mountain Railway is a  metre gauge single-line railway. It connects the town of Mettupalayam with the hill station of Udagamandalam (Ootacamund). The route is located within the state of Tamil Nadu and travels through the Nilgiri Hills, which are popularly known as the Blue Mountains of Southern India. The Nilgiri is the only rack railway in India, and it uses an Abt rack system. The ABT system requires the use of special steam locomotives. The line contains 208 curves, 16 tunnels, and 250 bridges, causing the uphill journey along the route to take about 290min (4.8h), while the downhill journey takes 215min (3.6h).

Initially, the town of Coonoor was the final station on the line, but in September 1908 it was extended to Fernhill followed by Udagmandalam by October15, 1908. The system was described by Guilford Lindsey Molesworth in a report from 1886:

A unique feature of the line, which is still fully operational, is that its oldest and steepest track uses rack and pinion technology. The rack rail portion ends at Coonoor railway station. The longest tunnel of this section measures . The route has a gradient of 1:12.5 up to Coonoor, and past Coonoor to the final station the track has a ruling gradient of 1:23.

The Nilgiri Mountain Railway was declared a UNESCO World Heritage Site in July 2005.

Kalka–Shimla Railway

The Kalka–Shimla Railway runs between Kalka and Shimla. It became the summer capital of British India in 1864, and it also served as the headquarters of the British Army in India.

Until the railway's construction, the only access to Shimla was by village cartway. The railway line was constructed by the Delhi–Ambala–Kalka Railway Company, beginning in 1898 in the Siwalik Hills, and was completed in 1903.

The Kalka–Shimla Railway has 103 tunnels and 864 bridges. Many of the bridges are multi-arched, reminiscent of Ancient Roman aqueducts, and one bridge, which spans , is made with plate girders and steel trusses. Its ruling gradient is 1:33 or 3%, and it features 919 curves, with the sharpest at 48 degrees (a radius of ). The loops at Taksal, Gumman, and Dharampur help to attain flatter gradients.

The Kalka–Shimla Railway joined the Nilgiri and Darjeeling lines as a World Heritage Site in 2008.

World Heritage Sites - tentative list

Matheran Hill Railway

Its construction was led by Abdul Peerbhoy and financed by his father, Sir Adamjee Peerbhoy, of the Adamjee Group. The route was designed in 1900, with construction beginning in 1904 and completed in 1907. The original tracks were built using 30 lb/yd rails but were later updated to 42 lb/yd rails. Until the 1980s, the railway was closed during the monsoon season (because of the increased risk of landslides) but is now open all year. It is administered by Central Railways.

A unique feature of the line is its horseshoe embankments. Notable features of the route include Neral Station, the first on the route; the Herdal Hill section; the steep grade of Bhekra Khud; the One Kiss Tunnel (the only tunnel on the route, which earned its nickname because the tunnel is just long enough to exchange a kiss with one's partner); a water pipe station, which is no longer in operation; Mountain Berry, which features two sharp zigzags; Panorama Point; and finally, the end of the route at Matheran Bazaar.

Kangra Valley Railway
 

The line, which is part of the Northern Railway, was planned in May 1926 and commissioned in 1929. The line has 971 uniquely designed bridges and two tunnels. Two particularly important bridge structures are the steel arch bridge over the Reond nalah and the girder bridge over the Banganga River. The terminus stretch between Baijnath and Jogindernagar has a slope of 1:25.

Other railways

Jammu–Baramulla line
The Jammu–Baramulla line is a  railway line being built in India to connect the state of Jammu and Kashmir with the rest of the country. The railway starts from Jammu and will travel to Baramulla.

The route crosses major earthquake zones and is subjected to extreme temperatures of cold and heat, as well as inhospitable terrain, making it a challenging engineering project. The railway line has been under construction since 2002, when it was declared a national project. It will link the state's winter capital, Jammu, with the summer capital, Srinagar, and beyond until Baramulla. The railway line has been built from Jammu to Katra, and the line from Katra to Banihal may be completed by 2020.

Proposed railways
The Srinagar–Leh line is a proposed railway line to run from Srinagar station via the town of Kargil to Leh to be operated by Indian Railways. The line was designated a national project on February26, 2013.

The Bhanupli–Leh line is a proposed railway line that is planned to connect Bhanupli in Punjab to Leh in Ladakh region in India. The Bhanupli–Leh line is expected to become the highest railway track in the world by its completion, overtaking the current record of China's Qinghai–Tibet railway.

The Rishikesh–Karnaprayag Railway, also an under construction, is a new railway link extension from the existing Rishikesh railway station to Karnaprayag of the above system.

The Sivok–Rangpo line is a proposed railway line planned to connect the towns of Sevoke in West Bengal and Rangpo in Sikkim and also link Sikkim with the Indian Railway network. It is planned to be extended to Gangtok and the India-China border in the future.

See also
 Mountain railway

References

Notes

Bibliography

External links

World Heritage Sites in India